Theo Schönhöft (9 May 1932 – 26 July 1976) was a German international footballer who played as a forward for VfL Osnabrück.

References

External links
 

1932 births
1976 deaths
German footballers
Germany international footballers
Association football forwards
VfL Osnabrück players